Dead Trigger is a 2017 American science fiction action horror film directed by Mike Cuff and Scott Windhauser, they was also both writers with Heinz Treschnitzer. The film is based on the mobile game of the same name. The film stars Dolph Lundgren, Autumn Reeser, Brooke Johnston, Chris Galya, Romeo Miller and Isaiah Washington.

The film was released in a limited release and through video on demand in the United States on May 3, 2019, by Saban Films.

Plot
After failing to stop a virus turning people into bloodthirsty zombies, the government develops a video game to recruit the most talented players to combat the real-life horde. Led by Captain Kyle Walker, the team must fight through an army of the undead to locate a group of scientists that may have developed a cure for the virus.

Cast

Dolph Lundgren as Captain Kyle Walker
Autumn Reeser as Tara Conlan
Brooke Johnston as Lieutenant Marchetti
Chris Galya as Chris Northon
Romeo Miller as Gerald "G-Dog" Jefferson
Isaiah Washington as Rockstock
Oleg Taktarov as Lieutenant Martinov
Justin Chon as Daniel Chen
Natali Yura as Naomi Shika
Luciana Carro as Samantha Atkins
Joel Gretsch as General Conlan
James Chalke as Father Julian
Jeff Lam as Eric Green
Bleona as Natalie
Tamara Braun as Gloria Russo
Brandon Beemer as CSU Agent Pierce
Tony Messenger as CSU Agent Sawyer
Seira Kagami as Lika
Alyona Chekhova as Nika
Michael Kupisk as Zack
Keil Oakley Zepernick as Subject Zero
Derek Boone as Lieutenant Krycek

Release

Theatrical
Dead Trigger first screened at the 2017 Moscow International Film Festival. The film was released theatrically and video-on-demand on May 3, 2019.

Reception

Critical response
Bobby LePire of Film Threat gave the film four stars out of ten.

See also
 List of films based on video games

References

External links
 
 

2017 films
2017 horror films
2017 science fiction action films
2010s science fiction horror films
American films about revenge
American action horror films
American science fiction action films
American science fiction horror films
American zombie films
Films set in Mexico
Films set in Utah
2010s English-language films
2010s American films
Live-action films based on video games